Adabelle is an unincorporated community in Bulloch County, in the U.S. state of Georgia.

History
A post office called Adabelle was established in 1900, and remained in operation until 1907. In 1900, Adabelle had about 85 inhabitants.

References

Unincorporated communities in Bulloch County, Georgia
Unincorporated communities in Georgia (U.S. state)